The 1998–99 Ole Miss Rebels men's basketball team represented the University of Mississippi in the 1998–99 NCAA Division I men's basketball season. The Rebels were led by first-year head coach, Rod Barnes. The Rebels played their home games at Tad Smith Coliseum in Oxford, Mississippi as members of the Southeastern Conference. This season marked the fourth NCAA Tournament appearance in school history.

Schedule and results

|-
|-
!colspan=6 style=|Non-conference regular season

|-
!colspan=6 style=|SEC regular season

|-
!colspan=12 style=| SEC tournament

|-
!colspan=12 style=| NCAA tournament

Source:

References 

Ole Miss
Ole Miss Rebels men's basketball seasons
Ole Miss
Ole Miss Rebels men's basketball
Ole Miss Rebels men's basketball